The 2008 Scottsdale mayoral election was held on August 28, 2008 to elect the mayor of Scottsdale, Arizona. It saw the reelection of Jim Lane.

Results

References 

2012
Scottsdale
Scottsdale